A number of television films, and long-form special episodes of television series, have been produced for the United States cable network Nickelodeon since 1998, and have been broadcast under the banner "Nickelodeon Original Movie".

1990s
 Doom Runners (April 25, 1998)

2000s

2000
 Cry Baby Lane (October 28, 2000)

2001
 As Told by Ginger: Summer of Camp Caprice (July 7, 2001)
 The Wild Thornberrys: The Origin of Donnie (August 18, 2001)

2002
 Rocket Power: Race Across New Zealand (February 16, 2002)

2003

 The Electric Piper (February 2, 2003)
 Maniac Magee (February 23, 2003)
 The Fairly OddParents: Abra-Catastrophe! (July 12, 2003)
 Rocket Power: Reggie's Big (Beach) Break (July 19, 2003)
 As Told by Ginger: Far from Home (August 9, 2003)

2004

 The Jimmy Timmy Power Hour (May 7, 2004)
 The Adventures of Jimmy Neutron: Boy Genius: Win, Lose, and Kaboom (July 9, 2004)
 Rocket Power: Island of the Menehune (July 16, 2004)
 The Fairly OddParents: Channel Chasers (July 23, 2004)

2006

 Drake & Josh Go Hollywood (January 6, 2006)
 The Jimmy Timmy Power Hour 2: When Nerds Collide (January 16, 2006)
 The Jimmy Timmy Power Hour 3: The Jerkinators (July 21, 2006)

2007

 The Naked Brothers Band: The Movie (January 27, 2007)
 Ned's Declassified School Survival Guide: Field Trips, Permission Slips, Signs and Weasels (June 8, 2007)
 Shredderman Rules (June 9, 2007) 
 The Last Day of Summer (July 20, 2007)
 Drake & Josh: Really Big Shrimp (August 3, 2007)
 Roxy Hunter and the Mystery of the Moody Ghost (October 30, 2007)

2008

 Roxy Hunter and the Secret of the Shaman (February 1, 2008)
 The Fairly OddParents: Fairly OddBaby (February 18, 2008)
 The Naked Brothers Band: Polar Bears (June 6, 2008)
 Roxy Hunter and the Myth of the Mermaid (July 13, 2008)
 Sozin's Comet: The Final Battle (July 19, 2008)
 Gym Teacher: The Movie (September 12, 2008)
 Roxy Hunter and the Horrific Halloween (October 31, 2008)
 iCarly: iGo to Japan (November 8, 2008)
 Merry Christmas, Drake & Josh (December 5, 2008)

2009
 Spectacular! (February 16, 2009) 
 Mr. Troop Mom (June 19, 2009)

2010s

2010

 School Gyrls (February 21, 2010)
 Fred: The Movie (September 18, 2010)
 The Boy Who Cried Werewolf (October 23, 2010)
 A Very School Gyrls Holla-Day (December 4, 2010)

2011

 Best Player (March 12, 2011)
 iParty with Victorious (June 11, 2011)
 A Fairly Odd Movie: Grow Up, Timmy Turner! (July 9, 2011)
 Fred 2: Night of the Living Fred (October 22, 2011)

2012

 Big Time Movie (March 10, 2012)
 Winx Club: The Secret of the Lost Kingdom (March 11, 2012)
 Rags (May 28, 2012)
 Fred 3: Camp Fred (July 28, 2012)
 A Fairly Odd Christmas (November 29, 2012)

2013

 Winx Club 3D: Magical Adventure (May 20, 2013)
 Nicky Deuce (May 27, 2013)
 House of Anubis: Touchstone of Ra (U.S.: June 17, 2013/UK: June 14, 2013)
 Swindle (August 24, 2013)
 Jinxed (November 29, 2013)

2014
 Terry the Tomboy (June 21, 2014)
 A Fairly Odd Summer (August 2, 2014)
 Santa Hunters (November 28, 2014)

2015
 
 Splitting Adam (February 16, 2015)
 Genie in a Bikini (May 25, 2015)
 One Crazy Cruise (June 19, 2015)
 The Massively Mixed-Up Middle School Mystery (August 1, 2015)
 Liar, Liar, Vampire (October 12, 2015)

2016
 
 Rufus (January 18, 2016)
 Lost in the West (May 28–30, 2016) (miniseries)
 Legends of the Hidden Temple (November 26, 2016)
 Albert (December 9, 2016)

2017

 Rufus 2 (January 16, 2017)
 Escape from Mr. Lemoncello's Library (October 9, 2017)
 Hey Arnold!: The Jungle Movie (November 24, 2017)
 Tiny Christmas (December 2, 2017)

2018
 Blurt! (February 19, 2018)

2019
 Bixler High Private Eye (January 21, 2019)
 Lucky (March 8, 2019)

2020s

2021
 A Loud House Christmas (November 26, 2021)

2022 
 Monster High: The Movie (October 6, 2022)
 Snow Day (December 16, 2022)

2023
 Monster High 2 (Fall 2023)

See also
 List of programs broadcast by Nickelodeon
 List of programs broadcast by Nick at Nite
 List of Nick Jr. original programming
 List of programs broadcast by Nicktoons
 List of programs broadcast by TeenNick

References

Nickelodeon
Lists of American animated films
Lists of television films
Nickelodeon-related lists